NGC 4299 is a  featureless spiral galaxy located about 55 million light-years away in the constellation Virgo. It was discovered by astronomer William Herschel on March 15, 1784 and is a member of the Virgo Cluster.

NGC 4299 forms an interacting pair with NGC 4294.

Physical characteristics
NGC 4299 has a fairly featureless disk with a very small, weak bulge and weak, asymmetric spiral arms plus numerous bright HII regions.

At the center of NGC 4299 lies a nuclear star cluster with a diameter of ~.

Truncated Hα disk
NGC 4299 has a truncated Hα disk with the outer extent of the Hα having an irregular distribution except in the southwest where it forms a well-defined ridge. This appears to be the result of ram-pressure.

Interaction with NGC 4294
As a result of a tidal interaction with NGC 4294, NGC 4299 has a disturbed optical and HI morphology, with asymmetric spiral arms, a small, weak bar and a high global star formation rate that appears to have been enhanced by ram-pressure.

HI tail
Chung et al. identified that NGC 4299 has a one sided tail of neutral atomic hydrogen (HI). The tail points to the southwest and appears to be a result of ram-pressure or by a tidal interaction with NGC 4294. The tail has no optical counterpart and is oriented parallel to the HI tail found in NGC 4294.

NGC 4299 appears to have a second tail pointing to the southeast that is much broader and lower in HI surface density than the main tail.

Black Hole
NGC 4299 may harbor an intermediate-mass black hole with an estimated mass ranging from 7,000 (7*10^3) to 200,000 (2*10^5) solar masses.

See also
 List of NGC objects (4001–5000)

References

External links

4299
7414
39968
+02-32-010
Virgo (constellation)
Astronomical objects discovered in 1784
Spiral galaxies
Virgo Cluster
Interacting galaxies
Discoveries by William Herschel